Moufida Bourguiba née Mathilde Lorrain (24 January 1890 – 15 November 1976) was the first wife of the President of Tunisia, Habib Bourguiba, and the inaugural First Lady of Tunisia from 1957 to 1961.

Biography

Mathilde Lorrain was born in France in 1890 in Saint-Maur-des-Fossés, Val-de-Marne. She married a French officer, Colonel le Fras who was killed at the very end of the First World War on 11 November 1918. She met Habib Bourguiba in 1925 whilst he was studying law at the University of Paris. Their only son, also Habib, was born in April 1927 and they married in August 1927.

After independence she converted to Islam and took the name "Moufida" on 25 October 1958. Her husband awarded her with a number of honours but she is claimed to have said that she only did things for him and his country.

The couple divorced in 1961. She died in Monastir in 1976. Her husband remarried Wassila Ben Ammar.

References

1890 births
1976 deaths
First Ladies of Tunisia
People from Saint-Maur-des-Fossés
French emigrants to Tunisia
Tunisian people of French descent
Converts to Islam from Christianity
French Muslims